The Police and Fire Services (Finance)(Scotland) Act 2001 is an Act of the Scottish Parliament. It was passed by the Parliament on 1 November 2001 and received Royal Assent on 5 December 2001. It was repealed upon the enactment of the Police and Fire Reform (Scotland) Act 2012, which merged Scotland's territorial police and fire services into national bodies, Police Scotland and the Scottish Fire and Rescue Service.

Preamble
"An Act of the Scottish Parliament to make provision about the carrying forward by police authorities, joint police boards and joint fire boards of unspent balances from one financial year to the next; and for connected purposes."

Repeals and Amendments
No other legislation was repealed by this Act.

The Act amended the Police (Scotland) Act 1967 (c.77) and Fire Services Act 1947 (c.41).

References

Acts of the Scottish Parliament 2001
Public finance of Scotland
Law enforcement in Scotland
Fire and rescue in Scotland